The Tianyuan is a Go competition in China organized by the Chinese Weiqi Association. The word tiānyuán literally means the center or origin of heaven, and is the center point on a Go board; the name is similar to the Japanese Tengen and Korean Chunwon. The competition was established in 1987 and is held annually.

Formerly, the winner went on to face Japan's Tengen winner in the China–Japan Tengen from 1988 to 2002, and Korea's Chunwon winner in the China–Korea Tengen from 1997 to 2015. Both of those competitions have been discontinued.

Outline
The Tianyuan competition is sponsored by the Zhongguo Qiyuan, New People's Evening News, and New People's Weiqi Monthly Magazine. It consists of a preliminary tournament in which 32 players compete against one another to determine the challenger to the previous year's winner. The preliminary is a single-elimination format, and the title match is decided in a best-of-three. As of 2022, the winner receives 400,000 RMB in prize money and the runner-up receives 200,000.

Past winners and runners-up

References 

Tianyuan
Recurring sporting events established in 1987